Don O. Hendrix (1905–1961) was an American optician.

In 1932, American scientist, inventor, and optician Don Hendrix began developing the Schmidt Camera at the Mount Wilson Observatory in Southern California, where by 1942 he would go on to become the master optician. A genius with only a highschool education, Hendrix was a prolific inventor who by his death in 1962, in addition to his accomplishments and contributions to astronomy and optics had hundreds of patents to his name, most of which were donated to the U.S. Government. He experimented with various technologies and among many firsts was the first person to use aluminum instead of silver in the mirrors he created for the Carnegie Institute's telescopes. During the time he spent at the Carnegie Institute he worked on many projects for the U.S. government, including a co-authored patent for the proximity fuse for use in missiles and bombs, considered to be one of the most important inventions in history outside of the discovery of atomic energy.  Due to the top secret nature of this and other projects, he never openly received credit for these inventions.  During his time at the Mount Wilson and Palomar observatories, he became a protege of Edwin Hubble, and many other noted astronomers, and it is believed that alongside Hubble he contributed to the big bang theory. He was responsible for finishing and polishing the Palomar Observatory's 200-inch primary and the 120-inch primary at Lick Observatory, among many other contributions.

In 1958 he became a member of the board of directors of Davidson Optronics, Inc. He invented a modified Twyman-Green interferometer (called the Hendrix Interferometer).

The crater Hendrix on the Moon is named after him.

References

1905 births
1961 deaths
Hendrix, Don
American scientific instrument makers